Reginald Jacob Cannon (born June 11, 1998) is an American professional soccer player who plays as a right-back for Portuguese Primeira Liga club Boavista and the United States national team.

He played one year of college soccer for the UCLA Bruins in 2016 and made his Major League Soccer debut for FC Dallas the following year, totalling 75 appearances for the club. In 2020, he moved to Boavista for a potential fee of $3.5 million.

Cannon made his first appearance for the United States national team in 2018. He played at the CONCACAF Gold Cup in 2019 and 2021, winning the latter as well as the 2021 CONCACAF Nations League Finals

Youth and development 
Cannon played high school soccer at Grapevine Faith Christian School in Grapevine, Texas, coached by Matt McKinney. During his freshman year Grapevine Faith won the TAPPS Division 2 Texas state championship in boys' soccer. In high school Cannon played for the FC Dallas academy team. Cannon won back-to-back national championships for FC Dallas's academy before joining University of California, Los Angeles.

Cannon played one year of college soccer at the University of California, Los Angeles in 2016, making 20 appearances for the Bruins. He was one of three players and the only freshman to appear in and start every match for the Bruins. Further, he finished the year having played 1,753 minutes; playing the third most minutes on the team.

Professional career

FC Dallas 
Cannon left college and signed a homegrown player contract with FC Dallas on December 22, 2016. He was the 18th homegrown player in Dallas's history.

On June 14, 2017, he made his professional debut when he started in a 2–1 win over Tulsa Roughnecks in the Lamar Hunt U.S. Open Cup. Cannon made his MLS debut for the club on September 2, in a 2–2 tie at home to the New York Red Bulls, as an added-time substitute for Michael Barrios.

In the 2018 season, Cannon cemented his place as a regular starter for the team. He made his first start for the team in their first game of the season, a 1–1 tie at home to Real Salt Lake on March 4. He totalled 34 appearances, and scored once to open a 2–2 tie against Vancouver Whitecaps FC at the Toyota Stadium on May 19.

Cannon played 29 games for Dallas in the 2019 season. He scored two goals for the team, a career high for the defender.

Amidst transfer speculation, Cannon signed a new, four-year contract with a team option with the team in March 2020.  He started the first two games of the season before the league went on hiatus due to the COVID-19 pandemic. His team did not take part in the subsequent season restart, MLS is Back Tournament, being forced to withdraw after ten players and one staff member tested positive for coronavirus.

Boavista
On September 9, 2020, FC Dallas announced that they had reached an agreement with Portuguese side Boavista F.C. for the transfer of Cannon in a deal worth up to $3.5 million, along with a 25–50% sell-on fee. He debuted for Boavista in the team's 2020–21 Primeira Liga opener against C.D. Nacional; the game ended in a 3–3 draw.

Cannon was sent off for the first time as a professional on November 5, 2021 in the 58th minute of a 5–2 home loss to F.C. Famalicão, for a foul on Iván Jaime.

International career
On October 16, 2018, Cannon made his first senior appearance for the United States men's national soccer team in a friendly against Peru, which finished 1–1. He made the cut for the 2019 CONCACAF Gold Cup, due to Tyler Adams's injury, and played four matches including the 1–0 final loss to Mexico.

Cannon faced strong competition at right-back from DeAndre Yedlin and Sergiño Dest. On June 6, 2021 he came on as a substitute for the former for the second half of extra time, as the United States defeated Mexico 3–2 in the CONCACAF Nations League final. Three days later, he scored his first senior international goal in a 4–0 friendly win over Costa Rica at the Rio Tinto Stadium. He made four appearances at the 2021 CONCACAF Gold Cup, as second-choice to Shaq Moore and starting only in the 1–0 win over Mexico in the final on August 1.

Cannon was not chosen for the 2022 FIFA World Cup, as Dest and Moore were selected at right-back.

Personal life
Cannon is the grandson of atmospheric scientist Dr. Warren Washington. His step-sister, Bianca Smith, is a professional baseball coach.

Cannon married his wife, Kendall, in April 2020.

On August 12, 2020, Cannon spoke out against Dallas fans for booing and throwing a bottle at the players before a 0–1 loss against Nashville SC because the players knelt during the national anthem in solidarity of the Black Lives Matter movement, calling the fans' actions "disgusting".  He subsequently received racist comments and death threats.

Career statistics

Club

International 

Scores and results list United States' goal tally first, score column indicates score after each Cannon goal.

Honors
United States
CONCACAF Gold Cup: 2021
CONCACAF Nations League: 2019–20

References

External links 
 UCLA bio
 
 
 

1998 births
Living people
People from Grapevine, Texas
Sportspeople from the Dallas–Fort Worth metroplex
Soccer players from Texas
Soccer players from Chicago
African-American soccer players
American soccer players
Association football fullbacks
UCLA Bruins men's soccer players
FC Dallas players
Boavista F.C. players
Homegrown Players (MLS)
Major League Soccer players
Primeira Liga players
United States men's international soccer players
2019 CONCACAF Gold Cup players
2021 CONCACAF Gold Cup players
CONCACAF Gold Cup-winning players
American expatriate soccer players
American expatriate sportspeople in Portugal
Expatriate footballers in Portugal
21st-century African-American sportspeople